Nothing Shines Like Neon is the eighth studio album by the American country music ensemble Randy Rogers Band.  Released on 15 January 2016 through Tommy Jackson Records, the album was produced by Buddy Cannon.

Commercial performance
In the USA, the album debuted at No. 5 on Top Country Albums, and No. 47 on Billboard 200, selling 11,500 copies in its first week. It sold a further 2,300 copies in its second week. The album had sold 15,100 copies up to February 2016.

Track listing

Personnel
Randy Rogers Band
 Brady Black - fiddle, background vocals
 Geoffrey Hill - electric guitar, background vocals
 Les Lawless - drums
 Jon Richardson - bass guitar, background vocals
 Randy Rogers - acoustic guitar, lead vocals

Additional musicians
 Jamey Johnson - duet vocals on "Actin' Crazy"
 Alison Krauss - background vocals on "Look Out Yonder"
 Randy McCormick - Hammond B-3 organ, piano, synthesizer, Wurlitzer
 John Ross Silva - background vocals
 Todd Stewart - mandolin, background vocals
 Bobby Terry - acoustic guitar, electric guitar, steel guitar
 Dan Tyminski - background vocals on "Look Out Yonder"
 Jerry Jeff Walker - duet vocals on "Takin' It as It Comes"
 Kyle Wieters - background vocals

Chart performance

References

2016 albums
Randy Rogers Band albums
Albums produced by Buddy Cannon